The 1942 All-Southwest Conference football team consists of American football players chosen by various organizations for All-Southwest Conference teams for the 1942 college football season.  The selectors for the 1942 season included the Associated Press (AP) and the United Press (UP).

All Southwest selections

Backs
 Cullen Rogers, Texas A&M (UP-1)
 Leo Daniels, Texas A&M (UP-1)
 Dick Dwelle, Rice (UP-1)
 Roy McKay, Texas (UP-1)

Ends
 Bruce Alford, Texas Christian (UP-1)
 Bill Henderson, Texas A&M (UP-1)

Tackles
 Derrell Palmer, Texas Christian (UP-1)
 Stanley Mauldin, Texas (UP-1)

Guards
 Felix Bucek, Texas A&M (UP-1)
 S. S. Barnett, Baylor (UP-1)

Centers
 Lester Gatewood, Baylor (UP-1)

Key
AP = Associated Press

UP = United Press

Bold = Consensus first-team selection of both the AP and UP

See also
1942 College Football All-America Team

References

All-Southwest Conference
All-Southwest Conference football teams